Thomas Henry Hart  (June 15, 1869 – September 17, 1939), nicknamed "Bushy", was an American professional baseball player who played catcher and outfielder in the Major Leagues for the 1891 Washington Statesmen.

External links

1869 births
1939 deaths
Major League Baseball catchers
Major League Baseball outfielders
Baseball players from New York (state)
19th-century baseball players
Washington Statesmen players
Lawrence Indians players
Augusta Kennebecs players
Fitchburg (minor league baseball) players